The Franco-Flemish War was a conflict between the Kingdom of France and the County of Flanders between 1297 and 1305.

Causes
Philip IV of France became king in 1285, and was determined to strengthen the French monarchy at any cost. The County of Flanders had been nominally part of the kingdom since the Treaty of Verdun in 843, but had maintained its de facto independence from the crown.

Flanders had some of the richest cities of that time, like Bruges, Ghent, Ypres, Lille and Douai. These cities tried to keep their independence from the Count of Flanders and from the rural aristocracy. But the cities were themselves divided between the rich patricians and the urban tradesmen, united in guilds.

In 1288, Philip IV used complaints over taxes to tighten his control over Flanders. Tension built between Guy of Dampierre, Count of Flanders and the King. In 1294, Guy turned for help to King Edward I of England, arranging a marriage between his daughter Philippa and the Prince of Wales. However, Philip imprisoned Guy and two of his sons, forced him to call off the marriage, and imprisoned Philippa in Paris until her death in 1306. Guy was summoned before the king again in 1296, and the principal cities of Flanders were taken under royal protection, until Guy paid an indemnity and surrendered his territories, to hold them at the grace of the King.

After these indignities, in 1297 Guy attempted to revenge himself on Philip by an alliance with Edward I, now at war with France. Philip responded by declaring Flanders annexed to the royal domain and sending a French army under Robert II of Artois to conquer Flanders.

1297–1300

First phase of the war
In January 1297 Count Guy formally broke his allegiance to King Philip IV and allied himself with King Edward I of England, Count John of Holland, Count Henry III of Bar and the King of the Germans Adolf of Nassau. The Count of Flanders however would receive little support from his allies: an invasion of Champagne by the Count of Bar (June 1297) was easily beaten back, the German King encountered opposition from a French backed rival Albert I of Habsburg and fell in battle in 1298, and King Edward encountered opposition by the English nobility against a Flemish enterprise and was faced with the First War of Scottish Independence. This meant that Count Guy effectively faced the French alone.

The count’s eldest son Robert of Bethune speedily occupied Mortagne, at the confluence of the Scheldt and the Scarpe, and the castle of Helkijn. In March 1297 King Phillip IV arrested all partisans of Count Guy and seized all their property. Philip IV then occupied the castle of l’Ecluse near Douai. In June 1297 Philip IV gathered an army of about 3,000 knights at Compiegne. The French Army marched on Arras (6 June), Lens (12 June) and reached the Franco-Flemish border near Douai on 14 June 1297. The next day part of the French cavalry, led by the king's brother Charles of Valois and by Raoul de Nesle crossed the border near Râches and encountered part of the Flemish Army, consisting of German hired troops, which was beaten back. After this setback Orchies surrendered to France. Valois' troops raided and burned the countryside up to Lille, but then returned to the French main army.

On 16 June 1297 the entire French Army entered Flanders marching upon Lille and burning the towns of Seclin and Loos on the way. On 17 June the city of Lille was invested and a formal siege, lasting ten weeks, began. During the siege, French raiding parties marched through the Flemish countryside, burning or conquering the towns of Komen, Waasten, and Kortrijk, which surrendered to Valois.

In August 1297, the French troops were reinforced when Robert of Artois returned from his successful campaign against Edward in Aquitaine. Artois' troops marched upon Cassel, which, except for the Flemish occupied castle, was burned, and to Sint-Winoksbergen, which surrendered. By 20 August, Artois' troops had reached Veurne. The Flemish counter-attack on Artois ended in a French victory at the Battle of Furnes (20 August 1297). Five days later Lille surrendered to King Philip and the 3,000-man strong Flemish Army, led by Robert of Bethune, was allowed to march out to Roeselare.

Although facing problems at home, at the end of August 1297 King Edward eventually moved an army of 895 knights and 7,560 infantry and bowmen to Flanders. Finding no support in Bruges, the king moved to Ghent and made that city his base of operations in Flanders.

After the fall of Lille, the French main army marched upon Kortrijk and Ingelmunster. On 18 September 1297 Philip was met with a delegation from Bruges which surrendered the city to him. The city was occupied by French troops led by Raoul de Nesle and Guy IV, Count of Saint-Pol but its port Damme was retaken by troops led by Robert of Bethune.

Armistice 1297–1300
Papal mediation led to an armistice, starting in October 1297 and at times prolonged until 1300. During this period negotiations between the French and English Kings and the other warring parties, including Count Guy, took place at the Papal court, while simultaneously strengthening the defences of the Flemish towns in their hands. Having reached an agreement with his barons to fight the Scottish threat, in March 1298 Edward and his forces left Flanders, effectively abandoning his Flemish allies.

King Edward's expedition to help Flanders was aborted and he made peace with Philip in 1298 and left Guy to his fate.

Second phase of the war: French conquest
By the end of 1299 Count Guy had turned over the government to his eldest son Robert. After the expiration of the armistice in January 1300, the French invaded Flanders again, starting skirmishes alongside the armistice line of 1298. A French detachment led by Wale Paièle plundered and burned the countryside around Ypres and Cassel, and Charles of Valois marched from Bruges to the outskirts of Ghent, burning Nevele and twelve other towns and hamlets. From March 1300 the French besieged Damme and Ypres, where the defences respectively was led by the Count's sons William of Dendermonde and Guy of Namur. At the end of April William surrendered Damme, Aardenburg and Sluis. Ghent surrendered to the French on 8 May, Oudenaarde on 11 May, and Ypres on 21 May 1300. By mid-May the old count, his sons Robert and William and several Flemish nobles were led into captivity in France, and the whole of Flanders was under French control.

French occupation and local insurrection (1300–1302)
The conquest of Flanders had been relatively easy, because the Flemish cities had remained neutral up to then. The patricians had a long history of conflict with the Count of Flanders over the level of control the count had over the (financial) affairs of the cities. The patricians had turned to the French King for support, who had thankfully intervened in their favour, thus increasing his influence in Flanders. The Flemish supporters of the French King were called Leliaards (supporters of the French Lily), and also included a part of the rural aristocracy.

The urban proletariat hoped for more justice and a better distribution of wealth under the new ruler, but Philip IV appointed Jacques de Châtillon as governor of the county, a very bad choice. Together with the Leliaards, this undiplomatic soldier imposed a very repressive government, raising new taxes, which infuriated the Flemish.
Soon the urban guilds forged an alliance with the Flemish nobles supporting the count. They were called Liebaarts or Klauwaards (after the Claws of the Flemish Lion).

On 19 May 1302, a rebellion broke out in Bruges where the Flemish populace killed every Frenchmen they could find, including the French garrison. This event was called the Bruges Matins. De Châtillon escaped with his life.

Now the rebellion became general. William of Jülich, the grandson of Count Guy, arrived in Bruges, and became the leader of the Flemish uprising. He was supported by his uncles John I, Marquis of Namur and Guy of Namur. Soon, most of Flanders was under their control. Only Cassel and Kortrijk remained in French hands and the city of Ghent remained neutral.

When the Flemish besieged Kortrijk on 9 and 10 July, a powerful French army led by Count Robert II of Artois arrived to crush the rebellion. The two forces clashed on 11 July in an open field near the city in a battle that became known as the Battle of the Golden Spurs. The Flemish prevailed against all expectations. The renowned French cavalry was stopped by the tactically sound position of the Flemish militia and the muddy terrain and many French knights were slaughtered.

This battle returned full independence to Flanders for the next two years. Two attempts by the French King to take revenge for this embarrassing defeat were averted by a Flemish army under William of Jülich at the Battle of Arques (1303), followed by a Flemish incursion into France which led to the Siege of Tournai (1303).

1304–1305
In the meantime Flanders was again at war with the Count of Holland. John II, Count of Holland since 1299, also ruled over the County of Hainaut and the County of Zeeland, and was part of the House of Avesnes, the hereditary enemy of the Flemish House of Dampierre. Zealand had been contested between the Count of Flanders and the Count of Holland since the early 11th century and had become part of Holland by 1076. The Flemish invaded Hainaut in 1302 and conquered Lessines. Guy of Namur, son of the Count of Flanders, formed a fleet at Sluis and sailed on 23 April 1303 to claim Zeeland for the Flemish. After some initial successes, Guy was defeated on 10 and 11 August 1304 in the Battle of Zierikzee by a combined Franco-Hollandic fleet under Rainier Grimaldi, who had been sent by Philip IV of France to aid the Count of Holland. Guy of Namur was captured and Zeeland remained firmly in the hands of the Count of Holland.

One week after this naval battle, on 18 August Philip IV personally led a French army against the Flemish main army at the Battle of Mons-en-Pévèle, here William of Jülich met his death.

After further minor battles, eventually the Treaty of Athis-sur-Orge was signed on 23 June 1305 which recognised Flemish independence as a fief, but at the cost of the cities of Lille, Douai and Bethune, which were transferred to the French crown-lands, and the paying of exorbitant fines to Philip IV.

See also
Courtrai Chest

References

Sources

Verbruggen, J. F. and Falter, Rolf, 1302 Opstand in Vlaanderen, Lannoo, 2010, 324 p.

 
1290s in France
1300s in France
Wars involving France
History of Flanders
Wars of the Middle Ages
1290s conflicts
1300s conflicts